Cake copyright is the assertion of copyright on a cake.

Copyright of art on cakes
Cakes can be an artistic medium for displaying any image or portraying any character. If a cake is used as an artistic medium for presenting copyrighted content, then copyright issues might come into play with a cake as with any other publication medium. Entertainment media organizations including Disney, Lucasfilm, and Sanrio have asserted that cakes should not portray their copyrighted fictional characters or their copyrighted images without licensing.

Copyright on cake design
Cake design is an imagining of a cake as copyrightable art, like a sculpture.

Bakeries which provide cakes which critics have ridiculed for low quality have sometimes sought to claim copyright over their cakes. The copyright claim is part of an attempt to enforce demands that communities of people who mock cakes not publish photos of cakes for entertainment.

Cake copyright at Trump inauguration
In 2012 in the United States President Obama had celebrity pastry chef Duff Goldman design a certain cake for a party celebrating his inauguration. In 2017 United States President Trump had a Washington, D.C. bakery replicate Obama's cake made for his inauguration. There was discussion about whether Trump plagiarized Obama's cake.

The matter raised the profile of copyright questions about cakes.

References

External links
Copyright Law for Cake Decorators, by Cakerschool on YouTube

Copyright law
Cake decorating